Por un puñado de besos is a 2014 Spanish-Venezuelan romantic comedy film directed by . It stars Ana de Armas and Martiño Rivas as Sol and Dani, alongside Marina Salas, Megan Montaner, Joel Bosqued, Alejandra Onieva, Jan Cornet and Andrea Duro.

Plot 
The plot tracks the developments in the romantic relationship between Dani and Sol, both seropositive.

Cast

Production 
Based on the 1993 novel Un poco de abril, algo de mayo y todo septiembre by Jordi Sierra y Fabra, the screenplay was penned by David Menkes. A Spanish-Venezuelan co-production, the film was produced by José Frade PC and Garra Producciones, and it had the participation of RTVE and Telemadrid. Shooting had already begun in Madrid by July 2013.  was responsible for the music, Néstor Calvo for the cinematography and Esther Cardenal for film editing.

Release 
The film was presented on 26 March 2014 at the 17th Málaga Film Festival's official competition. Distributed by eOne Films Spain, it was theatrically released in Spain on 16 May 2014.

Reception 
Mirito Torreiro of Fotogramas considered that "mawkish, set somewhere out of time (and out of Spanish society, of course)", the film "will only appeal to adolescents with no memory and fans of its protagonists".

Andrea G. Bermejo of Cinemanía underscored the film to be "teen cinema, without moralizing or complexes".

Javier Ocaña of El País wrote that David Menkes "picked up a few major themes and turned them into something inferior, unworthy, shallow and blushing".

Accolades  

|-
| align = "center" | 2015 || 29th Goya Awards || Best Costume Design || Cristina Rodríguez ||  || align = "center" | 
|}

See also 
 List of Spanish films of 2014

References

External links 
 Por un puñado de besos on RTVE Play

2014 romantic comedy films
2010s Spanish-language films
Spanish romantic comedy films
Venezuelan comedy films
Films shot in Madrid
Films based on Spanish novels
2010s Spanish films